The 2001 Pennzoil Freedom 400 was an NASCAR Winston Cup Series race held on November 11, 2001 at Homestead Miami Speedway in Homestead, Florida. Contested over 267 laps on the 1.5 mile (2.4 km) speedway, it was the 34th race of the 2001 NASCAR Winston Cup Series season. Bill Elliott of Evernham Motorsports won the race. The Freedom moniker was picked up following the events of 9/11.

Bill Elliott's 41st career win snapped his 226 race winless streak, the longest streak in between race wins, dating back to Darlington in 1994, as well as the 1st for Evernham Motorsports. The NBC Broadcast of the race featured a television appearance of Bill Elliott's son and future NASCAR Cup Series Champion Chase Elliott, who was 6 years old in 2001.

Top 10 results

References

Pennzoil Freedom 400
Pennzoil Freedom400
NASCAR races at Homestead-Miami Speedway